Catfish Creek is a  long 2nd order tributary to Chartiers Creek in Washington County, Pennsylvania.

Course
Catfish Creek rises about 0.5 miles west of Laboratory, Pennsylvania, and then flows northwest through the City of Washington to join Chartiers Creek in Washington.

Watershed
Catfish Run drains  of area, receives about 39.0 in/year of precipitation, has a wetness index of 357.21, and is about 20% forested.

See also
 List of rivers of Pennsylvania

References

Rivers of Pennsylvania
Rivers of Washington County, Pennsylvania